Jennifer Ann Mee (born July 28, 1991) is a convicted American murderer known as the "Hiccup Girl" for her long-lasting case of the hiccups. Mee appeared on national American television shows such as NBC's Today Show many times. Mee was arrested for first-degree murder in 2010. After a trial she was convicted and sentenced to life in prison without parole in 2013. M. William Phelps wrote a book about her that was published in 2016.  Her transmutation from "media darling" to convicted murderer attracted renewed national attention.  Her conviction and sentence have received criticism in a law review that alleges that if she were male she would have been sentenced more leniently.

"Hiccup girl"
In 2007, when Mee was 15 years old, she gained international fame when she developed a case of uncontrollable hiccups. She appeared on television shows all over the United States hoping to find a cure. Mee claimed to be hiccupping 50 times a minute. National media competed to book her for morning shows.  Her "world record" bout of hiccups has been compared to the world record for sneezing. The causes and treatment of her condition were disputed, but her popularity as an internet search item was long lasting. Her search for a hiccup cure included "[ingesting] sugar, peanut butter, breathing in a bag, [and] having people scare her". The hiccups were stopped after Mee was treated by Dr. Bob Linde.

Mee continued to get media attention after her hiccups stopped. In June 2007, she ran away from home and it was reported in the newspapers.

After Mee was cured she was no longer a media curiosity and dated a man named Lamont Newton. As she had a plan to find robbery victims online and set them up, Mee recruited Newton and another friend, Laron Raiford, to help her rob victims.

Crime
In 2010, Mee met up with a 22-year-old man she encountered online. She invited the man to a vacant home where two of Mee's friends robbed him of less than $50 and shot the man, killing him. As an accomplice to the crime, Mee was charged with murder. 

After meeting the victim (Shannon Griffin), Mee led him around to the back of a vacant home where her two friends (Laron Raiford and Lamont Newton) were waiting with a .38 (nominal ) caliber handgun. The victim was shot four times, but police did not know which suspect did the shooting.  

Mee, Raiford, and Newton all lived together and were arrested within hours of the crime. According to Sergeant Skinner of the St. Petersburg Police Department, Mee and her accomplices admitted to their involvement in the crime.

Trial
Prior to the trial, Mee's lawyer, John Trevena, offered to have Mee plead guilty in exchange for a 15-year sentence. Laron Raiford had been offered a sentence of 40 years in exchange for a guilty plea, but he rejected the deal.

Mee was represented by John Trevena in her murder trial. 

During the trial, the prosecution played a recording of a jailhouse phone call between Mee and her mother. During the call, Mee told her mother, "I didn't kill nobody...I set everything up. It all went wrong, Mom. It [expletive] just went downhill after everything happened, Mom." Also, experts testified that Mee's DNA was found on the victim's shirt. Mee's lawyer claimed his client suffers from schizophrenia. The judge ordered a psychological evaluation; however, it was determined that Mee was competent to stand trial. 

Another defense used by her lawyer was that Mee's hiccups were a symptom of Tourette's syndrome.

In 2013, Mee was found guilty of first-degree murder and sentenced to life in prison without parole. Her co-defendants – Laron Raiford and Lamont Newton – were also convicted of first-degree felony murder and sentenced to life in prison.

Mee's attorney moved for a new trial, which was subsequently denied. Her sentence was criticized in an article in the Hastings Women's Law Journal as purportedly disparate from that which would be imposed upon a similarly situated male.

See also
Felony murder and the death penalty in the United States

References

Citations

Bibliography

External links 
Jennifer Mee in a jailhouse interview
Jennifer Mee IMDb
Free Jennifer Mee website
 Enmund v. Florida from findlaw.com
 Tison v. Arizona from findlaw.com
 Enmund v. Florida from LII, Cornell University

1991 births
Living people
20th-century American criminals
American people convicted of murder
American female criminals
American prisoners sentenced to life imprisonment
Crime in Florida
Criminals from Florida
Criminals from Ohio
People with schizophrenia